Jean-Michel Moutier (born 18 March 1955) is a French former professional footballer who played as a goalkeeper.

Career
Born in Damelevières, Moutier played for Lunéville, Nancy B, Nancy and Paris Saint-Germain.

He later worked in executive roles at Nancy, Paris Saint-Germain, Rennes, Châteauroux and the United Arab Emirates national team.

References

1955 births
Living people
French footballers
AS Nancy Lorraine players
Paris Saint-Germain F.C. players
Ligue 1 players
Association football goalkeepers
AS Nancy Lorraine non-playing staff
Paris Saint-Germain F.C. non-playing staff
Stade Rennais F.C. non-playing staff
LB Châteauroux non-playing staff